Stefanos Zintzos (1917 – 1992) was a Greek fencer. He competed in the individual and team foil and team épée events at the 1948 Summer Olympics.

References

External links
 

1917 births
1992 deaths
Greek male fencers
Olympic fencers of Greece
Fencers at the 1948 Summer Olympics
Sportspeople from Alexandria
Egyptian people of Greek descent